Dominic Inglot and Mate Pavić were the defending champions, but Pavić chose not to participate this year. Inglot played alongside Marcus Daniell, but lost in the quarterfinals to Divij Sharan and Jan-Lennard Struff.

Nikola Mektić and Alexander Peya won the title, defeating Benoît Paire and Édouard Roger-Vasselin in the final, 7–5, 3–6, [10–7].

Seeds

Draw

Draw

References
Main Draw

2018 Grand Prix Hassan II